Travers is a hamlet in southern Alberta, Canada within Vulcan County.

History 
Travers was once a booming community along the Canadian Pacific Railway between Medicine Hat and Aldersyde. Travers gets its name from one of the railway's surveyors in 1914.

The first settlers to the area were Pete Brodie, William Dunlop, A. Keene, Tom Emelson, Fred VanHolm, J.W. Murphy, and Sidney Thurlow.

Travers' first grain elevator was built by Home Elevator Co. in 1914 next to the new railway, followed by an Ogilvie and United Grain Growers elevator.

Settlers of the area at the time had to receive their mail at Sundial, 15 miles southwest of Travers. George Shirley opened a post office 4 miles north of Travers in 1909. Soon after another was opened at a store in Rosemead, 3 miles southwest of Travers.

When the railway came Rosemead post office and store was relocated to Travers. With the arrival of the railway, Travers had a bank, barber shop, butcher shop, harness shop, two hardware and lumber yards, two blacksmiths, two livery barns, restaurants and boarding houses, garages and machine dealers, three grocery stores, pool room, men's clothing store, hotel and real estate office.

Very little remains from the pioneer era of Travers; the last two grain elevators were demolished on January 29, 1989. Many foundations, including the old bank vault, can still be seen along the quiet main street. As of 2000 only one resident remains in Travers.

Demographics 
The population of Travers according to the 2007 municipal census conducted by Vulcan County is 0.

See also 
 List of communities in Alberta
 List of hamlets in Alberta

References 

Hamlets in Alberta
Vulcan County